The Salmon Tower Building is a 31-story skyscraper located at 11 West 42nd Street and 20 West 43rd Street in Manhattan, New York City, near Bryant Park. It was designed by Albert J. Wilcox and finished in 1928. It was developed by a firm headed by Walter J. Salmon Sr. Directly to the west of the Salmon Tower Building is the former Aeolian Building, and to its east is 500 Fifth Avenue, also built by Salmon Sr.

History
Walter J. Salmon Sr. headed a firm to erected the building, known as 11 West 42nd Street, Inc. It was designed by Albert J. Wilcox.  The Salmon Tower Building was completed by early 1928, when its interior was more than 50 percent leased. The New York City headquarters to elect Herbert Hoover as U.S. president in 1928 were located in the Salmon Tower Building.

In September 1941, elevator operators in the building went on strike so only four of its eighteen elevators were operating on the morning of September 25. In October 1952 a fire in the structure's subbasement caused five firemen to be overcome from smoke inhalation.

Salmon Tower Building was sold by the estate of Charles Frederick Hoffman in June 1964, following an ownership of over sixty years. At the time its assessed value was $5.25 million and it was situated on a  land lot. It is currently owned by Tishman Speyer & Silverstein Properties. In 1980 Tishman Speyer & Silverstein Properties collaborated on a $25 million renovation.

Tenants
 Future plc
 CIT Group
 Kohn Pedersen Fox
 NPR
 Michael Kors
 Springer Publishing Company
 TV Guide
 New York University School of Professional Studies, also known as the "NYU Midtown Center", on the 4th, 5th, and 10th floors

Former tenants
The offices of The New Yorker magazine were moved to the building from its longtime home at 25 West 43rd Street, just to the north, in 1991. The magazine moved to 4 Times Square in 1999. TV Guide moved into the space in 2007.

References

External links

1928 establishments in New York City
42nd Street (Manhattan)
Bryant Park buildings
Cultural history of New York City
Office buildings completed in 1928
Skyscraper office buildings in Manhattan